The 1970 Florida State Seminoles football team represented Florida State University in the 1970 NCAA University Division football season.

Schedule

Roster

References

Florida State
Florida State Seminoles football seasons
Florida State Seminoles football